Rolando Garbey Garbey (born November 19, 1947 in Santiago de Cuba) is a retired Cuban boxer. He competed in the Light Middleweight (71 kg) category. He won an Olympic silver medal in 1968 and a bronze medal in 1976. In 1974, at the inaugural 1974 World Championships in Havana, Cuba, he won the world title. Garbey was also a gold medalist at light middleweight at the Pan-American games in 1967, 1971, and 1975.

Olympic results 
Mexico City - 1968
Quarterfinal: Defeated Eric Blake (Great Britain) by first-round knockout
Semifinal: Defeated Johnny Baldwin (United States) by decision, 4-1
Final: Lost to Boris Lagutin (Soviet Union) by decision, 0-5 (was awarded silver medal)

Munich - 1972
Defeated Ricky Barnor (Ghana) by decision, 5-0
Defeated Franz Csandl (Austria) by decision, 5-0
Defeated Jae Keun-Lim (South Korea) by second-round technical knockout
Lost to Wiesław Rudkowski (Poland) by decision, 1-4

Montreal - 1976
Round of 32: Defeated Dashnian Olzwoi (Mongolia) by third-round knockout
Round of 16: Defeated Earl Liburd (Virgin Islands) referee stopped contest in second round
Quarterfinal: Defeated Kalevi Kosunen (Finland) referee stopped contest in first round 
Semifinal: Lost to Tadija Kačar (Yugoslavia) by decision, 1-4 (was awarded bronze medal)

References

1947 births
Living people
Sportspeople from Santiago de Cuba
Boxers at the 1968 Summer Olympics
Boxers at the 1972 Summer Olympics
Boxers at the 1976 Summer Olympics
Olympic boxers of Cuba
Olympic silver medalists for Cuba
Olympic bronze medalists for Cuba
Pan American Games gold medalists for Cuba
Olympic medalists in boxing
Medalists at the 1968 Summer Olympics
Medalists at the 1976 Summer Olympics
Cuban male boxers
AIBA World Boxing Championships medalists
Boxers at the 1967 Pan American Games
Boxers at the 1971 Pan American Games
Boxers at the 1975 Pan American Games
Pan American Games medalists in boxing
Competitors at the 1974 Central American and Caribbean Games
Central American and Caribbean Games gold medalists for Cuba
Light-middleweight boxers
Central American and Caribbean Games medalists in boxing
Medalists at the 1967 Pan American Games
Medalists at the 1971 Pan American Games
Medalists at the 1975 Pan American Games